U nás v Kocourkově is a 1934 Czechoslovak drama film, directed by Miroslav Cikán. It stars   Jan Werich, Jindřich Plachta, and Václav Trégl. It was one of several films the director made with Werich, and features him as a convict. The film is largely set in a prison.

Cast
Jan Werich as Ferdinand Kaplan - Convict no. 1313
Jindřich Plachta as Jalovec - poacher
Václav Trégl as Ludvík Espandr - Barber
Zdeňka Baldová as Nykysová - widow
Ladislav Pešek as Dr. Nykys
Jaroslav Vojta as Mayor Adam
Hermína Vojtová as the Mayor's wife
Marie Tauberová as Blazenka
Svetla Svozilová as Lily - circus performer
Jaroslav Marvan as Director of prison
Stanislav Neumann as Prisoner in solitary confinement
Jaroslav Průcha as Detective
Jan Richter as Detective

References

External links
U nás v Kocourkově at the Internet Movie Database

1934 films
Czechoslovak drama films
1934 drama films
Films directed by Miroslav Cikán
1930s prison films
Czechoslovak black-and-white films
1930s Czech films